Visions of the Emerald Beyond is the fifth album by the jazz fusion group Mahavishnu Orchestra, and the second released by its second incarnation.

According to the liner notes, the album was recorded at Electric Lady Studios in New York City from December 4 until December 14, 1974. It was then mixed at Trident Studios in London from December 16 until December 24, 1974.

Poem

This poem by Sri Chinmoy, titled "Visions of the Emerald Beyond", was printed on the album cover.

"No more am I the foolish customer
of a dry, sterile, intellectual breeze.
I shall buy only
the weaving visions of the emerald Beyond.
My heart-tapestry
shall capture the Himalayan Smiles
of my Pilot Supreme.
In the burial of my sunken mind
is the revival of my climbing heart.
In the burial of my deceased mind
is the festival of my all-embracing life."

Track listing

All songs by John McLaughlin except where indicated.

Personnel

Mahavishnu Orchestra
 John McLaughlin – guitars, vocals
 Jean-Luc Ponty – violin, vocals, electric violin, baritone violin
 Ralphe Armstrong – bass guitar, vocals, contrabass
 Narada Michael Walden – percussion, drums, vocals, clavinet
 Gayle Moran – keyboards, vocals

Others
 Carol Shive – 2nd violin, vocals
 Russell Tubbs – alto and soprano sax
 Philip Hirschi – cello
 Bob Knapp – flute, trumpet, flugelhorn, vocals, wind
 Steve Kindler – 1st violin

Charts

References

Mahavishnu Orchestra albums
1975 albums
Albums produced by Ken Scott
Columbia Records albums
Albums recorded at Electric Lady Studios
Albums recorded at Trident Studios